The 2012 CFL season was the 59th season of modern-day Canadian football.  Officially, it was the 55th season for the Canadian Football League. The pre-season began on June 13, 2012, and the regular season started on June 29, 2012. Rogers Centre in Toronto hosted the 100th Grey Cup on November 25, with the hometown Toronto Argonauts defeating the Calgary Stampeders 35-22.

CFL news in 2012

Salary cap 
According to the new collective bargaining agreement, the 2012 salary cap will be set at $4,350,000. As per the agreement, the cap is fixed and will not vary with league revenue performance. The minimum team salary will be set at $4,000,000 with individual minimum salaries set at $44,000.

Season schedule 
The 2012 season schedule was released on February 18, 2012, with the regular season opening on June 29 at Ivor Wynne Stadium in Hamilton, Ontario. This marked the first time Hamilton has opened the year since 2009. Additionally, the league returned to division match-ups in the final week of the regular season, which was also last seen in 2009. Following an interruption in the Labour Day Classic in 2011 between the Toronto Argonauts and Hamilton Tiger-Cats, the two teams resumed their historic series in 2012. There were 15 double headers this year, with four on Fridays, eight on Saturdays, one on Sundays, and two (the traditional Labour Day and Thanksgiving contests) on Mondays.

The BC Lions opened their regular season schedule at the newly refurbished BC Place Stadium and spent their first full season there after splitting time between that stadium and Empire Field in 2011. The Winnipeg Blue Bombers spent the first four weeks of the regular season on the road as their home opener at the brand new Investors Group Field was to take place in week 5; however, construction delays pushed back the opening of the new stadium to 2013, forcing the Blue Bombers to continue playing at Canad Inns Stadium during the season. The Tiger-Cats played—and won—their final regular season home game at Ivor Wynne Stadium on October 27 as the stadium was demolished following the 2012 season. Unlike the previous two seasons, there was no game played in Moncton, New Brunswick as part of the Touchdown Atlantic promotion, due to the league wanting to focus on plans for the 100th Grey Cup festival.

Bye weeks 
This year's bye weeks occurred in the sixth and seventh weeks of the season, earlier than the usual eighth and ninth week setup that has been in place since 2007. This was likely done to accommodate the 2012 Summer Olympics, and the television coverage they demanded, which took place over these two weeks.

Uniform changes 
According to an email, Reebok and the CFL were in the process of designing new home and away uniforms for each of the eight teams for 2012. On April 11, 2012, it was officially announced that all eight teams would be playing in re-engineered jerseys that feature increased elasticity, improved resiliency and moisture wicking technology. East Division teams released their jersey designs on May 1, while West Division teams unveiled their new jerseys on May 2.

Rule changes 

On April 18, 2012, the CFL announced that they had unanimously approved a rule change that will see all scoring plays subject to video review. All touchdowns would be reviewed by the referees, without a team having to use its challenge flag. Due to a surprising number of incidents related to players helmets falling off during play in the 2011 CFL season, the league decided to change its rules to address this issue. Now if a ball carrier's helmet comes off the play will be blown dead immediately. If a non-ball carrier's helmet comes off that player can no longer participate in the play. If he does, the player's team will be penalized 10 yards for illegal participation. If a player hits an opposing player who isn't participating because he lost his helmet, the offending player's team will be penalized 15 yards for unnecessary roughness.

100th Grey Cup 
Toronto was the site of the 100th Grey Cup as it was also host of the very first game and host of the 50th Grey Cup as well. As part of the celebration, the Grey Cup festival stretched over nine days as opposed to the usual three. The Government of Canada will also contribute $5 million towards the event in celebration of a Canadian tradition.

Records and milestones
 On June 29, while playing against the Winnipeg Blue Bombers and with the former record holder Milt Stegall in attendance, Geroy Simon became the all-time CFL career reception yards leader, surpassing the previous mark of 15,153 yards.
 On September 3, Chris Williams surpassed Henry Williams for most kick return touchdowns in a single season with his sixth (five punt returns, one missed field goal return). In the same game, he also set a new record for most consecutive games with a return touchdown with three.
 On October 12, Andrew Harris set a new single-season record for yards from scrimmage by a Canadian, surpassing Terry Evanshen's mark of 1,662 yards set in 1967. Harris finished with 1,830 yards, becoming the second non-import to lead the league in yards from scrimmage.
 On November 1, Chad Owens passed Michael Clemons for most combined yards in a season with a 29-yard kickoff return. Owens finished the season with 3,863 all-purpose yards while also becoming the first professional football player to record three 3,000-yard seasons. Owens also became the first player to lead the league in both receiving yards (1,328) and total kick return yards (2,510).
 On November 2, Jon Cornish surpassed Normie Kwong for most rushing yards in a season by a Canadian, finishing with 1,457 rushing yards. Cornish also finished first in rushing, which was the first time that a non-import led the league in rushing since Orville Lee in 1988.
 On November 2, J. C. Sherritt recorded his 130th tackle, passing Calvin Tiggle's mark of 129 for most tackles in a single season.

Off-season

Coaching changes

The 2012 off-season saw significant changes in key personal across the league. After winning the 99th Grey Cup, the then head coach of the BC Lions, Wally Buono, resigned from being the head coach so he could focus on his duties as general manager. The Lions promoted Mike Benevides, who was the defensive coordinator for four seasons, to head coach. After an 8-10 season, the Hamilton Tiger-Cats fired head coach Marcel Bellefeuille and hired George Cortez who has had extensive coaching experience with many different CFL teams. Following a very disappointing 2011 season, the Saskatchewan Roughriders hired Corey Chamblin as their new head coach. Finally, the Toronto Argonauts hired Scott Milanovich who had been the offensive coordinator of the Montreal Alouettes for four seasons, to replace Jim Barker who, like Wally Buono, resigned from being the head coach to focus on being general manager.

Regular season

Structure

Teams play eighteen regular season games, playing two of the three divisional opponents three times, the other four times, and teams from the opposing division twice. Teams are awarded two points for a win and one point for a tie. The top three teams in each division qualify for the playoffs, with the first place team gaining a bye to the divisional finals. A fourth place team in one division may qualify ahead of the third place team in the other division (the "Crossover"), if they earn more points in the season.  Such was the case in the 2012 season;  Edmonton (the fourth-place team in the West) had more points than Winnipeg (the third-place team in the East).

If two or more teams in the same division are equal in points, the following tiebreakers apply: 

a) Most wins in all games
b) Head to head winning percentage (matches won divided by all matches played)
c) Head to head points difference
d) Head to head points ratio
e–g) Tiebreakers b–d applied sequentially to all divisional games
h–i) Tiebreakers c–d applied sequentially to all league games
j) Coin toss

Notes:

1. If two clubs remain tied after other club(s) are eliminated during any step, tie breakers reverts to step a).
2. Tiebreakers do not apply to the Crossover. To cross over a team must have more points than the third place team.

Standings

Note: GP = Games Played, W = Wins, L = Losses, T = Ties, PF = Points For, PA = Points Against, Pts = Points

Teams in bold are in playoff positions.

CFL playoffs

The Toronto Argonauts won their 16th Grey Cup championship on home turf at the Rogers Centre by defeating the Calgary Stampeders. Argonauts' running back Chad Kackert was named the MVP, while Argonauts' defensive end, Ricky Foley was named the Grey Cup's Most Valuable Canadian.

Playoff bracket

CFL Leaders
 CFL Passing Leaders
 CFL Rushing Leaders
 CFL Receiving Leaders

Award winners

CFL Player of the WeekSourceCFL Player of the MonthSource''

2012 CFL All-Stars

Offence
QB – Anthony Calvillo, Montreal Alouettes
RB – Jon Cornish, Calgary Stampeders
RB – Andrew Harris, BC Lions
R – Nik Lewis, Calgary Stampeders
R – Weston Dressler, Saskatchewan Roughriders
R – Chad Owens, Toronto Argonauts
R – Fred Stamps, Edmonton Eskimos
OT – Josh Bourke, Montreal Alouettes
OT – Jovan Olafioye, BC Lions
OG – Scott Flory, Montreal Alouettes
OG – Dimitri Tsoumpas, Calgary Stampeders
OC – Luc Brodeur-Jourdain, Montreal Alouettes

Defence
DT – Armond Armstead, Toronto Argonauts
DT – Bryant Turner, Winnipeg Blue Bombers
DE – Charleston Hughes, Calgary Stampeders
DE – Keron Williams, BC Lions
LB – Adam Bighill, BC Lions
LB – J. C. Sherritt, Edmonton Eskimos
LB – Shea Emry, Montreal Alouettes
CB – Joe Burnett, Edmonton Eskimos
CB – Pat Watkins, Toronto Argonauts
DB – Korey Banks, BC Lions
DB – Ryan Phillips, BC Lions
S – Kyries Hebert, Montreal Alouettes

Special teams
K – Rene Paredes, Calgary Stampeders
P – Rob Maver, Calgary Stampeders
ST – Chris Williams, Hamilton Tiger-Cats

2012 CFL Western All-Stars

Offence
QB – Travis Lulay, BC Lions
RB – Jon Cornish, Calgary Stampeders
RB – Andrew Harris, BC Lions
R – Weston Dressler, Saskatchewan Roughriders
R – Chris Getzlaf, Saskatchewan Roughriders
R – Nik Lewis, Calgary Stampeders
R – Fred Stamps, Edmonton Eskimos
OT – Ben Archibald, BC Lions
OT – Jovan Olafioye, BC Lions
OG – Brendon LaBatte, Saskatchewan Roughriders
OG – Dimitri Tsoumpas, Calgary Stampeders
OC – Angus Reid, BC Lions

Defence
DT – Ted Laurent, Edmonton Eskimos
DT – Almondo Sewell, Edmonton Eskimos
DE – Charleston Hughes, Calgary Stampeders
DE – Keron Williams, BC Lions
LB – Adam Bighill, BC Lions
LB – J. C. Sherritt, Edmonton Eskimos
LB – Juwan Simpson, Calgary Stampeders
CB – Joe Burnett, Edmonton Eskimos
CB – Keon Raymond, Calgary Stampeders
DB – Korey Banks, BC Lions
DB – Ryan Phillips, BC Lions
S – Donovan Alexander, Edmonton Eskimos

Special teams
K – Rene Paredes, Calgary Stampeders
P – Rob Maver, Calgary Stampeders
ST – Tim Brown, BC Lions

2012 CFL Eastern All-Stars

Offence
QB – Anthony Calvillo, Montreal Alouettes
RB – Avon Cobourne, Hamilton Tiger-Cats
RB – Chad Simpson, Winnipeg Blue Bombers
R – S. J. Green, Montreal Alouettes
R – Chris Matthews, Winnipeg Blue Bombers
R – Chad Owens, Toronto Argonauts
R – Chris Williams, Hamilton Tiger-Cats
OT – Josh Bourke, Montreal Alouettes
OT – Glenn January, Winnipeg Blue Bombers
OG – Scott Flory, Montreal Alouettes
OG – Peter Dyakowski, Hamilton Tiger-Cats 
OC – Luc Brodeur-Jourdain, Montreal Alouettes

Defence
DT – Armond Armstead, Toronto Argonauts
DT – Bryant Turner, Winnipeg Blue Bombers
DE – John Bowman, Montreal Alouettes
DE – Alex Hall, Winnipeg Blue Bombers
LB – Chip Cox, Montreal Alouettes
LB – Shea Emry, Montreal Alouettes
LB – Renauld Williams, Hamilton Tiger-Cats
CB – Pat Watkins, Toronto Argonauts
CB – Jovon Johnson, Winnipeg Blue Bombers
DB – Dwight Anderson, Montreal Alouettes
DB – Jonathan Hefney, Winnipeg Blue Bombers
S – Kyries Hebert, Montreal Alouettes

Special teams
K – Luca Congi, Hamilton Tiger-Cats
P – Josh Bartel, Hamilton Tiger-Cats
ST – Chris Williams, Hamilton Tiger-Cats

2012 CFLPA All-Stars

Offence
QB – Travis Lulay, BC Lions
RB – Jon Cornish, Calgary Stampeders
RB – Kory Sheets, Saskatchewan Roughriders
R – Chris Williams, Hamilton Tiger Cats
R – Weston Dressler, Saskatchewan Roughriders
R – Chris Matthews, Winnipeg Blue Bombers
R – Fred Stamps, Edmonton Eskimos
OT – Josh Bourke, Montreal Alouettes
OT – Glenn January, Winnipeg Blue Bombers
OG – Scott Flory, Montreal Alouettes
OG – Peter Dyakowski, Hamilton Tiger Cats
OC – Luc Brodeur-Jourdain, Montreal Alouettes

Defence
DT – Armond Armstead, Toronto Argonauts
DT – Almondo Sewell, Edmonton Eskimos
DE – Charleston Hughes, Calgary Stampeders
DE – Keron Williams, BC Lions
LB – Adam Bighill, BC Lions
LB – J. C. Sherritt, Edmonton Eskimos
LB – Renauld Williams, Hamilton Tiger Cats
CB – Dante Marsh, BC Lions
CB – Keon Raymond, Calgary Stampeders
DB – Korey Banks, BC Lions
DB – Jonathan Hefney, Winnipeg Blue Bombers
S – Kyries Hebert, Montreal Alouettes

Special teams
K – Rene Paredes, Calgary Stampeders
P – Burke Dales, Edmonton Eskimos
ST – Chris Williams, Hamilton Tiger-Cats

2012 Gibson's Finest CFL Awards 
 CFL's Most Outstanding Player Award – Chad Owens (WR/KR), Toronto Argonauts
 CFL's Most Outstanding Canadian Award – Jon Cornish (RB), Calgary Stampeders
 CFL's Most Outstanding Defensive Player Award – J. C. Sherritt (LB), Edmonton Eskimos
 CFL's Most Outstanding Offensive Lineman Award – Jovan Olafioye (OL), BC Lions
 CFL's Most Outstanding Rookie Award – Chris Matthews (WR), Winnipeg Blue Bombers
 John Agro Special Teams Award – Chris Williams (KR), Hamilton Tiger-Cats
 Tom Pate Memorial Award – Brian Bratton (WR), Montreal Alouettes
 Jake Gaudaur Veterans' Trophy – Graeme Bell (FB) - Saskatchewan Roughriders 
 Annis Stukus Trophy – Scott Milanovich, Toronto Argonauts
 Commissioner's Award – Every CFL Player
 Hugh Campbell Distinguished Leadership Award - Brian Williams, CBC, and TSN broadcaster

References 

Canadian Football League seasons
2012 in Canadian football